Mario Héber Usher (1921 - 19 May 1980) was a Uruguayan political figure.

Background

Mario Héber was a prominent member of the Uruguayan National (Blanco) Party. His parents were Blanca Usher Conde and Alberto Héber Uriarte (grand-nephew of Juan D. Jackson). He was from a well-known political family;  his brother Alberto Héber was President of Uruguay from 1966 to 1967; his son Luis Alberto Héber is a National Party Senator and former Deputy.

Elected offices

In 1958 he was elected a Deputy. Usher was President of the Chamber of Deputies of Uruguay from March 1, 1966 to March 1, 1967. In 1971 he was elected a Senator.

Family incident

In 1978 his wife, Cecilia Fontana, was assassinated by poison intended for himself, sent by an unknown person or group. Other politically prominent families were also - unsuccessfully - targeted. This tragic incident has been widely blamed on political violence associated with the period of civilian-military rule in Uruguay, which began in 1973, after which Mario Héber and many other politicians were proscribed from political activities, but which he continued to pursue clandestinely.

Diplomatic repercussions 

In 2008 US Ambassador to Uruguay Frank E. Baxter was involved in a series of controversial high level exchanges in respect of these yet unresolved issues.

Death

He died in 1980.

See also

 Politics of Uruguay
 List of political families#Uruguay
 Frank E. Baxter#Admits Mitrione case 'pushback' equivalence in response to Uruguayan assassination investigation

References

 :es:Mario Heber

1921 births
1980 deaths
Presidents of the Chamber of Representatives of Uruguay
Members of the Chamber of Representatives of Uruguay
Members of the Senate of Uruguay
Uruguayan people of German descent
Uruguayan people of British descent
National Party (Uruguay) politicians